The Kidstory Series is a series of six interactive storybooks for children, developed by Brilliant Interactive Ideas and produced by Active Imagination (a Packard Bell company) on CD-ROM for Mac OS and Microsoft Windows. The stories are narrated by the host Mick. Glen Uslan, the Vice President of Active Imagination, intended the products to be affordable for customers, while retaining good quality. The company intended to have a total of 15 titles produced by the end of the year. By 1996, the company invested around $400,000 in additional titles.

Games in the series

Commercial performance
Packard sold its computer products that came with a CD that included three of six Kidstory software products. From the United States, the products were sold worldwide in Australia, New Zealand and parts of Europe and Asia. Packard also had the products translated in Japanese in an agreement with Fujitsu.

Critical reception
Packard's Kidstory series was rated as an A+ Learning Library.

See also
 Interactive storybook

References

Software for children
Video game franchises
Video game franchises introduced in 1995
Video games based on novels
Children's educational video games